The Royal Aero Club issued Aviators Certificates from 1910. These were internationally recognised under the Fédération Aéronautique Internationale.

List

Legend

See also
List of pilots awarded an Aviator's Certificate by the Royal Aero Club in 1910
List of pilots awarded an Aviator's Certificate by the Royal Aero Club in 1911
List of pilots awarded an Aviator's Certificate by the Royal Aero Club in 1912
List of pilots awarded an Aviator's Certificate by the Royal Aero Club in 1913
List of pilots with foreign Aviator's Certificates accredited by the Royal Aero Club 1910-1914

References

Aviation pioneers
Lists of aviators
1914 in aviation
Aviat
1914-related lists
1914 in the United Kingdom